HPE may refer to:

 Lancia Beta HPE, introduced 1975
 Lancia Delta HPE, introduced 1995
 Hennessey Performance Engineering
 Hewlett Packard Enterprise, global information technology company. 
 High Point Enterprise, a newspaper
 High-pressure electrolysis
 Holoprosencephaly,  a cephalic disorder
 Hope railway station (Wales), in Flintshire, Wales
 United Alignment of Nationalists, a Greek political alliance
 Protection Force of Êzîdxan